"The Return of the Crazy One" is the first single from Digital Underground's second album The Body-Hat Syndrome. It was written and produced by the D-Flow Production Squad, Digital Underground’s in-house production team.

Charts

References

1993 singles
Digital Underground songs
1993 songs
Tommy Boy Records singles
Songs written by Shock G